Warenia is a genus of sea snails in the family Muricidae, the murex snails or rock snails. There is one species in the genus: Warenia elegantula. This marine species occurs of the Aleutian Islands.

References

Further reading
 Dall W.H. (1907).  Descriptions of new species of shells, chiefly Buccinidae, from the dredgings of the U.S.S. "Albatross" during 1906, in the northwestern Pacific, Bering, Okhotsk, and Japanese Seas. Smithsonian Miscellaneous Collections. 50(2): 139-173
 Houart, R.; Vermeij, G.; Wiedrick, S. (2019). New taxa and new synonymy in Muricidae (Neogastropoda: Pagodulinae, Trophoninae, Ocenebrinae) from the Northeast Pacific. Zoosymposia. 13(1): 184-241

Trophoninae
Gastropod genera